Riya Sisodiya is an Indian actress and model who appeared in Tabrez Noorani and David Womark's 2018 film Love Sonia. She featured on cover of Verve India, Travel+Leisure India & South Asia Magazine. In February 2022, she further gained popularity from a Wild Stone advertisement, due its Punjabi folk background song "Nasha" which is sung by Amir Jalal and Faridkot.

Filmography

References

External links
Riya at Bollywood Hungama

1994 births
Living people
Indian film actresses
21st-century Indian actresses